The 2018–19 Liga Primera de Nicaragua season was  divided into two tournaments (Apertura and Clausura) and determined the 71st and 72nd champions in the history of the Liga Primera de Nicaragua, the top division of football in Nicaragua. The Apertura tournament was  played in the second half of 2018, while the Clausura was played in the first half of 2019.

Format
The Apertura play-off format was changed from previous years, while the Clausura will use the same 4-team play-off format. For the Apertura, the top four teams from the regular stage advanced to a "quadrangular" double-round robin instead of a play-off stage. The regular stage and quadrangular winners would have played to decide the tournament's champion, but ultimately the same team won both and the final was not necessary. The same format was recently adopted by the Costa Rican Primera División, but for both half seasons.

Team information 

A total of ten teams contested the league, including eight sides from the 2017–18 Primera División, and two sides from the 2017–18 Segunda División.

FC San Francisco Masachapa finished last in the aggregate table and were relegated to the Segunda División. The champions from the Segunda División, ART Municipal Jalapa were promoted in their place.

The 9th place team in the aggregate table, Chinandega FC, faced the second place team from the Segunda División, Deportivo Sebaco, in a playoff for a spot in the Primera División. However, due to Sebaco's financial problems, they were not allowed in the playoff, meaning Chinandega remained in Primera División.

Promotion and relegation 

Promoted from Segunda División as of July, 2018.

 Champions: ART Municipal Jalapa

Relegated to Segunda División  as of July, 2018.

 Last Place: FC San Francisco Masachapa

Managerial changes

Before the start of the season

During the Apertura season

Between Apertura and Clausura seasons

Clausura 2019 seasons

Apertura

Personnel and sponsoring

Standings

Results

Records

Top goalscorers

Playoffs

Quarterfinals 

Juventus Managua progressed.

Diriangén progressed.

Semifinals 

 TBD wins on away goals

First leg

Second leg 

Real Esteli won 7-3 on aggregate.

Managua won 4-1 on aggregate.

Final

First leg

Second leg 

Managua won 1-0 on aggregate.

Clausura

Personnel and sponsoring

Standings

Results

Records

Top goalscorers

Playoffs

Quarterfinals 

Walter Ferretti progressed.

Diriangén  progressed.

Semifinals

First leg

Second leg 

Real Esteli progressed 3-1 on aggregate.

Managua F.C. advances 1-0 on away goals.

Final

First leg

Second leg 

3-3, Real Esteli won on away goal.

Aggregate table

List of foreign players in the league 
This is a list of foreign players in the 2018–19 season. The following players:

 Have played at least one game for the respective club.
 Have not been capped for the Nicaragua national football team on any level, independently from the birthplace

A new rule was introduced this season, that clubs can have four foreign players per club  and can only add a new player if there is an injury or a player/s is released and it is before the close of the season transfer window.

 (player released during the Apertura season)
 (player released between the Apertura and Clausura seasons)
 (player released during the Clausura season)

External links
 http://www.ligaprimera.com/ocotal
 https://int.soccerway.com/national/nicaragua/primera-division/20172018/apertura/r41773/
 https://futbolnica.net/category/futbol-de-primera/

Nicaraguan Primera División seasons
1
Nicaragua